are miniature household altars provided to enshrine a Shinto . They are most commonly found in Japan, the home of  worship.

 
Worship at the  typically consists of the offering of simple prayers, food (e.g., rice, fruit, water) and flowers. Before worshiping at the  it is ritually important for family members to cleanse their hands or mouth.

 can also be found in some traditional Japanese martial arts dojos.

Acquisition and care

Both  and  can be obtained at any large Shinto shrine.  by themselves can be displayed on a counter or anywhere visible, provided that they are kept in their protective pouches.

 First, a  cannot be set up on the ground or at eye level. It must be above an ordinary person's eye level.  
 Second, a  cannot be set up over an entrance; it must be built into a space which people will not walk under.  

These rules apply both to one's household and to martial arts dojos.

 are replaced before the end of each year. However,  can be kept in one's house until they are no longer usable.

Examples

See also
  – analogous concept in Japanese Buddhism
 Etiquette in Japan
 
 
 Spirit house

Notes

References

Bibliography
 Ono, Sokyo, Shinto: The Kami Way, Charles E. Tuttle Company, 

Altars
Japanese architectural features
Japanese home
Shinto in Japan
Shinto religious objects
Japanese words and phrases